Friedrich August Belcke (27 May 1795 Lucka, Saxe-Gotha-Altenburg – 10 December 1874) was a celebrated trombonist in Berlin in the 19th century.

In 1815, after two solos with the Leipzig Gewandhaus Orchestra, Belcke had a 30-year career as a trombone soloist.

In 1819 a critic admired a concert given by Belcke in Leipzig for its
"clarity and precision, distinctness and pleasing sound, plus something truly noble in the imposing trombonistic figurations, as well as astonishing skill in that which is not idiomatic to the instrument - for example, rapid passages, cantabile, trills, etc." [1]

The other well-known trombonist of his time was Carl Traugott Queisser.

References 

Rasmussen, M: 'Two early nineteenth-century trombone virtuosi', Brass Quarterly, 5, No. 1 (1961)
Herbert, Trevor: The Trombone, Yale University Press, 2006.  pp144–145

1795 births
1874 deaths
People from Lucka
People from Saxe-Gotha-Altenburg
German classical trombonists
Male trombonists
19th-century German musicians
19th-century German male musicians
19th-century classical trombonists